Rhinocerotoidea is a superfamily consisting of three family groups of odd-toed ungulates, three of which, the Amynodontidae, Hyracodontidae, and Paraceratheriidae, are extinct. The only extant  family group is the Rhinocerotidae (true rhinoceroses), which survives as five living species. The extinct members of this superfamily are often called "rhinoceroses" alongside members of the family Rhinocerotidae, though they include genera, such as Paraceratherium, which do not closely resemble modern rhinoceroses.

Taxonomy
The cladogram below follows a phylogenetic analysis by Bai et al. (2020):

References

Odd-toed ungulates
Mammal superfamilies
Taxa named by John Edward Gray